St. Johnsville is a town in Montgomery County, New York, United States. The population was 2,631 at the 2010 census. Accounts vary as to the etymology of St. Johnsville, but most of them state that the town and its village are named after an early surveyor and commissioner, Alexander St. John. Still others credit the naming of St. Johnsville to a former name for the area, St. John's Church.

The Town of St. Johnsville is in the northwestern part of the county. The town contains a village, also called St. Johnsville. Both town and village are approximately halfway between Utica and Amsterdam.

The Erie Canal, as part of the Mohawk River, is at the town's southern border.

History 

The town was first settled around 1725.  The territory was part of the Palatine District.

In 1769, Sir William Johnson built a church in the town for the benefit of his Indian allies.

A brief skirmish was fought in the town in 1780 near Fort Klock, a fortified house.

The Town of St. Johnsville was formed in 1838 from the Town of Oppenheim ( which then became part of the newly created Fulton County ).

In 1857, the community of St. Johnsville set itself off from the town by incorporating as a village.

According to the Enterprise and News, Nov. 17, 1937, by 1934, Mr. and Mrs. Joseph H. Reaney  had given 120 acres of land to the Village of Saint Johnsville. This land was named Klock Park after Dr. Charles M. Klock, a highly regarded local physician. Today the H.C Smith Benefit Club utilizes the building to host many community events.

The First Methodist Episcopal Church of St. Johnsville, Fort Klock, Enlarged Double Lock No. 33 Old Erie Canal, Nellis Tavern, and Margaret Reaney Memorial Library are listed on the National Register of Historic Places.

Geography
According to the United States Census Bureau, the town has a total area of 17.4 square miles (45.0 km2), of which 16.8 square miles (43.6 km2)  is land and 0.5 square mile (1.4 km2)  (3.11%) is water.

The Mohawk River forms the southern town line.  The northern town boundary is the border of Fulton County, and the western town line is the border of Herkimer County, marked by East Canada Creek.

St. Johnsville is the smallest town in the county (by area).

NY-5 is an east-west highway in the southern part of the town. The western terminus of NY-67 is at NY-5, east of St. Johnsville village.  The southern terminus of NY-331 is near the northwestern part of the town.

Demographics

As of the census of 2000, there were 2,565 people, 1,043 households, and 658 families residing in the town.  The population density was 152.4 people per square mile (58.8/km2).  There were 1,170 housing units at an average density of 69.5 per square mile (26.8/km2).  The racial makeup of the town was 98.67% White, 0.08% Black or African American, 0.39% Native American, 0.16% Asian, 0.04% Pacific Islander, 0.12% from other races, and 0.55% from two or more races. Hispanic or Latino of any race were 1.36% of the population.

There were 1,043 households, out of which 27.8% had children under the age of 18 living with them, 45.7% were married couples living together, 12.0% had a female householder with no husband present, and 36.9% were non-families. 31.5% of all households were made up of individuals, and 17.5% had someone living alone who was 65 years of age or older.  The average household size was 2.35 and the average family size was 2.91.

In the town, the population was spread out, with 23.4% under the age of 18, 8.0% from 18 to 24, 24.1% from 25 to 44, 22.4% from 45 to 64, and 22.1% who were 65 years of age or older.  The median age was 41 years. For every 100 females, there were 91.6 males.  For every 100 females age 18 and over, there were 87.8 males.

The median income for a household in the town was $30,719, and the median income for a family was $39,830. Males had a median income of $25,000 versus $21,010 for females. The per capita income for the town was $15,116.  About 9.5% of families and 12.4% of the population were below the poverty line, including 20.4% of those under age 18 and 6.5% of those age 65 or over.

Communities and locations in the Town of St. Johnsville 
 East Canada Creek – A stream defining the western town line.
 Fort Klock – A historic fortified house, built by Johannes Klock in 1750, located east of St Johnsville village on the south side of NY-5. The property also contains other re-constructed or re-located historic structures.
 Klock Park – A park northwest of St. Johnsville village, named after Dr.Charles M.Klock.
 St. Johnsville – The Village of St. Johnsville is on the north shore of the Mohawk River on NY-5.
 West St. Johnsville (or Upper St. Johnsville) – A hamlet west of St. Johnsville village on NY-5.

References

External links
  St. Johnsville Chamber of Commerce
  St. Johnsville history links
  Early St. Johnsville history

Towns in Montgomery County, New York
Populated places on the Mohawk River